Newcastle is a civil parish in Northumberland County, New Brunswick, Canada.

For governance purposes it is divided between the city of Miramichi and the Greater Miramichi rural district, with small border areas belonging to the incorporated rural communities of Alnwick (Bartibog area) and Miramichi River Valley (Chaplin Island Road), all of which are members of the Greater Miramichi Regional Service Commission, and the Eel Ground 2 and Metepenagiag Uta'nk Indian reserves, which are not part of the RSC.

Prior to the 2023 governance reform, the parish was divided between Miramichi, the Indian reserves, and the local service districts of Lower Newcastle-Russellville and the parish of Newcastle.

Origin of name
Newcastle and Alnwick Parishes were erected simultaneously. Alnwick and Newcastle are the county town and largest city of historical Northumberland County, England. This may be the origin of the two parishes' names.

Another possibility is that the parish was named in honour of the Duke of Newcastle, Prime Minister of Great Britain 1757–1762. The Duke had no obvious connection to the name Alnwick.

History
Newcastle was erected in 1786 as one of Northumberland County's original parishes. including all or part of most parishes in Northumberland and Kent Counties.

Boundaries
Newcastle Parish is bounded:

 on the north by the Gloucester County line;
 on the east by a line beginning on the county line at a point about 3.3 kilometres west-southwesterly of Route 8, then running south to the Route 8 bridge over the Bartibog River, then down the Bartibog River to its mouth;
 on the south by the Miramichi River and Northwest Miramichi River;
 on the west by a line beginning on southeastern corner of a grant to Oliver Willard on the western side of Jones Cove, then running north to the county line;
 including Bartibog Island in the Miramichi.

Evolution of boundaries
The original boundaries of Newcastle were Westmorland County on the south, a line due west from the northern tip of Portage Island on the north, and a north-south line through the mouth of Cains River on the west.

In 1814 Northumberland County was completely reorganised and Newcastle took on a more recognisable shape. The boundary with Northesk was different, starting near the old courthouse and passing through the intersection of Newcastle Boulevard and Beaverbrook Road.

In 1824 the boundary with Northesk was moved west to its modern starting point on Jones Cove. The direction of the boundary was also changed to run north instead of prolongation a grant line, which transferred a triangle of territory in the south to Newcastle and a triangle in the north to Northesk.

In 1850 the boundary with Alnwick Parish was adjusted by running further up the Bartibog River before turning north.

Communities
Communities at least partly within the parish. bold indicates an incorporated municipality or Indian reserve; italics indicate a name no longer in official use

 Bartibog
  Beaver Brook Station
 Bellefond
 Beveridge
 Busby
 East Beaver Brook
  Eel Ground 2

 Highbank
 Little Bartibog
  Lower Newcastle
 Morrissy
 Patterson Siding
  Russellville
 Telly Road Crossing

  Miramichi
 Back Lots
 Cross Roads
  Douglastown
 Ferry Road
  Millbank

  Miramichi
 Moorefield
  Newcastle
  Nordin
 Northwest Bridge

Bodies of water
Bodies of water at least partly within the parish.

 Bartibog River
 Big Eskedelloc River
 Little Bartibog River
 Miramichi River

 Northwest Miramichi River
 Northwest Millstream
 Armstrong Lake
 The Lake

Islands
Islands at least partly within the parish.
 Bartibog Island

Other notable places
Parks, historic sites, and other noteworthy places at least partly within the parish.
 Bellefond Protected Natural Area
 East Branch Portage River Protected Natural Area
 Green Brook Protected Natural Area
 MacDonald Farm Provincial Park
 MacDonald Farm Wildlife Management Area

Demographics
Parish population total does not include Eel Ground 2 Indian reserve and portion within Miramichi

Population
Population trend

Language
Mother tongue  (2016)

See also
List of parishes in New Brunswick

Notes

References

Parishes of Northumberland County, New Brunswick
Local service districts of Northumberland County, New Brunswick